The Deersville Historic District is located along Main Street in Deersville, Ohio. The buildings in the district include several houses, a community hall, a general store, two inns, a church, and an antique store, many of which are closed. The district was added to the National Register on October 27, 2004.

References

Gothic Revival architecture in Ohio
National Register of Historic Places in Harrison County, Ohio
Historic districts on the National Register of Historic Places in Ohio